Ciao Darwin is a variety game show format created and hosted by Paolo Bonolis (Stefano Magnaghi is the co-creator), and produced by the Italian mass media company Mediaset.

There are two competing teams of 50 people each, usually made up of people who fit certain opposing stereotypes. In each game two members of the audience are selected at random, one from each team, indicated by a light in front of them which remains illuminated when all the other team members' lights have gone off. The games involve contestants competing in acts of skill, intelligence and general knowledge, with deliberately ridiculous results, trying to mimic the mechanism of natural selection theorized by Charles Darwin.  Some of the games are designed to humiliate the contestants, especially an assault course which was introduced with the Italian version in 2010, and the Finale which is a water tank game.

At each round a score by a vote in the studio by the audience consisting of 300 people. The sum of points at the end of the various tests determines the team in the lead for the Finale.

Original italian version
In Italy it was aired on Canale 5 from 1998 until 2000, hosted by Italian celebrities Paolo Bonolis and Luca Laurenti, and it returned again in 2003, 2007, 2010, 2016 and 2019.

Format

Early rounds
The early round in the show consist of singing a song, a debate between the two teams, an intelligence test and a test of courage.

The Obstacle Course (Italian version from 2010)
In the Obstacle Course round, officially called Genodrome, five or six randomly selected contestants from each team have to make their way around an assault course consisting mainly of:

 Crawling under nets, through cloth tubes or through elastic strings
 Climbing over a slippery slope and slide
 Crossing a pool by jumping onto unstable floating pontoons
 Crossing another pool by leaping along padded rotating rollers

Some contestants cannot make it up the slippery slope and are eliminated from the round. At the end the score is determined by a further competitor who slides down a rope and attempts to attach themselves with Velcro to a target on a vertical wall for as long as possible.

The contestants are given trainer shoes, and elbow and knee protectors, but otherwise remain fully dressed and must participate in the clothes that they are already wearing to the show. Almost all contestants fall into one of the two pools in clothes ranging from casual wear or fancy dress to expensive dresses or suits which are ruined by the water. The pools are approximately 1.3m deep and filled with cold water, and falling from the rollers results in total immersion.

In the Italian version in 2016, one variation is that fire hoses were played on the competitors as they try to cross the pontoons, and another variation involves them having to jump into the pool fully clothed and swim past the pontoons using inflatable rubber sharks as buoyancy aids.

The Fashion Show
This round consists of a fashion show featuring a number of competitors from each team are dressed for different contexts: "daytime", "evening", "disco", "intimate male" and "intimate female".

The Finale
In the Finale, the two selected contestants sit in tanks that are filled with more water each time an incorrect answer is given (and, in the case of the Italian and Polish versions, each time a correct answer is given by the other contestant). There are variations between the rules in the Italian, Romanian, Hungarian, Polish and Greek versions. The tank is cylindrical in shape in all but the Polish version, where it has flat sides.  The tank is entered through a door in the back or side which is sealed when the game begins. The water rises by increments that are marked on the side of the tank (except in Poland). The number of these varies:

 Italy – six – the loser is the first tank to be filled to the sixth level
 Romania – ten – the loser is the first who cannot remain seated and hold their breath underwater, which usually happens after level 8 or 9
 Hungary – nine – the loser is the first who cannot remain seated and hold their breath underwater, which usually happens after level 8
 Poland and Greece – five - the loser is the first who cannot remain seated and hold their breath underwater, which usually happens after level 4

As with the Obstacle Course round, the contestants remain fully dressed and participate in the clothes that they were already wearing to the show, although they are allowed to take off their shoes (except in the Romanian version) and their jewellery (except in the Italian version).

The tanks are filled with an initial amount of water determined by the relative scores of the competing teams (usually one increment for every 50 points difference). Normally this is between one and three increments. In theory it would be possible to answer all questions correctly and go away with just wet feet. In practice, however, the water level rises to at least chest height.

There have been some other strange variations, such as two people from the same team sitting together in the tank, contestants blindfolded and creatures like toads, snakes and ducks added, and dyed or foamy water being used. In all but the Hungarian version, contestants are given a snorkel to help them breathe, although this is seldom used. In the Hungarian and Polish versions, the rule about remaining seated is strictly enforced, and this often leads to the fully clothed contestants totally under the water by the end.

The voice commentary in the official promotional video for the Ciao Darwin franchise states "each week a winner emerges triumphant, and the loser is left all wet", suggesting that they are not offered a dry change of clothes to go home.

International versions
The format created in Italy has been sold in various countries on the world. The international rights are distributed by Distraction Formats.

References

External links
Official Site in Italian

Variety television series
1998 Italian television series debuts
Italian comedy television series
1990s Italian television series
Canale 5 original programming